Chennai, along with Mumbai, Delhi and Kolkata, is one of the few Indian cities that are home to a diverse population of ethno-religious communities. According to the 2011 census Chennai then had a total population of 4,681,087 at a density of 26,902 per square kilometre; the sex ratio was 986 and literacy rate was 90.33%. The most widely spoken languages are Tamil and English. Hinduism is followed by a majority of the populace followed by Islam and Christianity. Sikhism, Jainism, Buddhism and Zoroastrianism are other religions practiced.

History of enumeration

Based on the revenue comparisons for the years 1639 and 1648, the population of Madras in 1639, the year of its founding have been calculated as 7,000. Captain Thomas Bowrey in his 1670 book Countries around the Bay of Bengal gives one of the earliest estimates for the population of the city. According to him, Madras had a population of 30,000 including 300 Englishmen and 3,000 Portuguese. Alexander Hamilton in New Account of the East Indies and Persia (1718) wrote,

The idea of taking a census of Madras city was first mooted during the Presidency of Elihu Yale. After being shelved for a time, the question was raised again in 1801 when the United Kingdom decided to organise an all-India census. The first census of any part of the city was taken in 1795 when the population of Blacktown (presently Georgetown) was determined as 60,000. According to an 1822 estimate, Madras had a population of 462,051 while an 1863 report by Charles Trevelyan to the Royal Sanitary Commission records that there were not less than a million people in Madras city.
There have also been population estimates by other individuals, notable among them being Sir William Langhorne and Elihu Yale.While an Indian census was not organised until 1871, minor population headcounts of the city were taken by the Madras government on 4-year gaps from 1851-52 to 1866–67.

However, these early estimates and the methods used have been criticized by later enumerators. According to population scientist Christophe Guilmoto, the early enumerations were not censuses but "simple headcounts providing little information beyond the sub regional sex distribution". W. R. Cornish, who was the Madras Superintendent of the 1871 Census, the first organised census in British India, wrote

The first organized census of Madras city and its environs was undertaken in 1871 as a part of the India Census. Madras had a total population of 397,552 in 1871 making it India's third most populous city after Calcutta and Bombay.It was also the fifth largest city in the British Empire.

Population growth
The first census of India taken in 1871 gave a population of 397,552. The city was acutely affected by the great famine of 1876–77, with 1877 alone accounting for 40,500, and maintained a steady growth rate throughout the last decades of the 19th century. Between 1901 and 1921, however, the population growth rate was slow.

Religion

Hindus form the majority of Chennai's population but the city also has substantial Muslim and Christian minorities. As per the 2001 census, Hindus formed 81.3 percent of the total population while Muslims made up 9.4 percent and Christians, 7.6 percent.

 Hinduism

Hinduism is the majority faith in Chennai. The temples towns of Mylapore, Triplicane, Thiruvottiyur, Saidapet and Thiruvanmiyur, which are now part of Chennai city, had been visited by the Saivite saints called Nayanars. The saint Vayilar Nayanar was born and brought up in Mylapore. Sambandar gives a physical description of Mylapore in his hymns

The early dubashes or Indian merchants who worked for the British East India Company were devout Hindus. The Chennakesava Perumal Temple, considered to be the chief Hindu temple of Madraspatnam and first to be built since the founding of the city in 1640, was constructed by the dubash Beri Thimmanna in 1646. Chennai is also an important centre of the Ramakrishna Order whose oldest institution the Sri Ramakrishna Math was founded in Chennai in May 1897. Since 1882, Chennai has been the headquarters of the Theosophical Society, a spiritual organisation dedicated to the study of world religions and inter-faith dialogue.
According to a 1981 estimate, there were about 600 Hindu temples in Chennai city. The important among them are the Chennakesava Perumal Temple, Chenna Mallesvarar Temple Kapaleeswarar Temple, Parthasarathy Temple, Vadapalani Andavar Temple, Ashtalakshmi Kovil, Kalikambal Temple and the Thiruvalluvar Temple.

 Islam

There has been a recorded presence of Muslims in Chennai from the 9th century CE onwards. The oldest known mosques in Madras - the ones at Pulicat and Kovalam were built in the 10th century CE. Marco Polo in the 13th century and Duarte Barbarosa in the 16th century, both record that St. Thomas was venerated by Christians as well as Muslims of Madras.

 Christianity

The city also has one of the highest population of Christians among major Indian cities, accounting for 7.6% of the city's population.

Languages

Tamil is the most common language, being the mother tongue of about 76.7% of Chennai inhabitants, followed by Telugu (10.5%), Urdu (2.8%), Malayalam (2.2%) and Hindi (2.1%). English is commonly used as a second language by white-collar workers.  In 1891, the percentage of people who speak Tamil was 60.4% followed by Telugu 22.25% and the percentage of people who speak Tamil as their mother tongue had increased from 61.2 in 1901 to 76.7 in 1991 while those who speak Telugu had fallen from 21.3 in 1901 to 10.5 in 1991 and those of Urdu from 9.1 in 1901 to 2.8 in 1991 and English from 3.1 in 1901 to 0.3 in 1991. On the contrary, the percentage of people who speak Malayalam as their mother tongue has increased from 0.2 in 1901 to 2.2 in 1991 and Hindi, from 0.3 in 1901 to 2.1 in 1991.

The fall in the Telugu-speaking population has been attributed to the mass migration of Telugu-speakers from the city upon the formation of Andhra State in 1953 while the decrease in the proportion of people who spoke English as their mother tongue has been attributed to the departure of most Europeans and Anglo-Indians for the United Kingdom following India's independence in 1947. Only a handful of Hindi speakers appear to have lived in Chennai in 1901 and they did not have a notable presence till the inauguration of the Republic of India in 1950. However, since 1950, their numbers have increased rapidly.

In 1871, Madras has 60.2% Tamil population, 22.3% Telugu population. Most of the Telugu population Migrated to Madras from Telugu areas (Andhra in present) in 19th Century and some Tamil population are migrated to Madras from other parts of Tamil Nadu. There are over 200,000 Gujaratis in the city.

Ethnicities

Jains
There are both North-Indian and Tamil Jains in the city, although the former outnumber the latter. There are about 100 Jain temples in the city built by the North Indian Jains, whereas there are only 18 Tamil Jain temples catering to roughly 1,500 Tamil Jain families.

Sikhs
There is no known official record of the first arrival of Sikhs in the city. However, it is believed that the migration has been consistent before, during, and post partition of India. As of 2012, there were about 300 Sikh families residing in the city. Sri Guru Nanak Sat Sangh Sabha, established in 1949, is a centre for social, religious and spiritual activities and is a common point for the Sikh families in the city to converge during special occasions and festivals.

Zoroastrians
The first Parsis came to Madras in 1809 from Coorg when the ruling King's brother sent a deputation to the Governor of Fort St. George to deliver a picture. Hirijibhai Maneckji Kharas was the first Parsi to land in the city, who was accompanied by five other Parsis and two priests who bought land at Royapuram opposite the Catholic Church. By the 1900s, the Parsis were generally a prosperous lot, dealing in cars, cycles, perfumes and dyes. The first Iranis came to Madras around 1900 and soon became known for their Irani cafes and also established or managed theatres. There was no official priest in the community for over 100 years till 1906. There was no place of worship till the Royapuram fire temple was built in 1909.

As of 2010, there were about 250 Parsis in Chennai. Many of them live in Royapuram.

Japanese
As of 2013, there were about 700 Japanese in the city.

Koreans

Chennai is the earliest hub of the Korean community in India, owing to Hyundai's decision to open factories in the city in 1995. Koreans concentrated largely in the Kilpauk township, which has acquired the nickname of "Little Korea" as a result. The Korean community in the city continued to grow in the following years, and by 2009, there were about 3,000 Koreans in the city, up from about 700 in 2006. Since then, Koreans make up the largest number of expatriates in Chennai. As of 2013, there are over 4,000 Koreans in the city. According to the Korea Trade Centre, the city has over 150 Korean companies, including Hyundai Motors, Samsung, LG, and Lotte. Several small and medium enterprises, mainly automobile spare parts, logistics and engineering companies, such as Hwashin, Dong-Sung and Doowon, have their operations to support these large firms.

Many Koreans in Chennai work for Hyundai Motors and its suppliers. Some expatriates have also opened Korean restaurants, aimed largely at their co-ethnics rather than local Indians. Koreans have also formed a number of Christian churches in India, including two in Chennai; others include two in New Delhi and one in Mumbai.

Nepalis

Around 5-6 lakh Nepali speaking people live in Chennai since a long time, half of them are Indian originated from various parts of North East and Darjeeling, Kalimpong and Duars part of West Bengal and also from Sikkim, rest are from Nepal, the Nepali speaking people are engaged in various professions like beauty and salon, hotel and services, guard for houses and also in IT and teachings.

Notes

Chennai
Chennai